Douglas Harold Copp  (January 16, 1915 – March 17, 1998) was a Canadian scientist who discovered and named the hormone calcitonin, which is used in the treatment of bone disease.

Born in Toronto, Ontario, he received his MD from the University of Toronto in 1939 and his PhD in biochemistry from the University of California at Berkeley in 1943. In 1950 he became the first head of the physiology department in the newly established Faculty of Medicine at the University of British Columbia.

In 1967 he received the Gardner International Award  jointly with the British endocrinologist Iain Macintyre who had sequenced calcitonin and showed it originated in the thyroid gland. He was a Fellow of both the Royal Society (elected 1971) and the Royal Society of Canada.

Honours
 In 1971 he was made an Officer of the Order of Canada and was promoted to Companion in 1980.
 In 1972 he was awarded the Flavelle Medal Award of the Royal Society of Canada.
 In 1994 he was inducted into the Canadian Medical Hall of Fame.
 In 2000 he was inducted into the Canadian Science and Engineering Hall of Fame.

References

1915 births
1998 deaths
Canadian biochemists
Companions of the Order of Canada
Fellows of the Royal Society of Canada
Canadian Fellows of the Royal Society
People from Toronto
Academic staff of the University of British Columbia Faculty of Medicine
UC Berkeley College of Chemistry alumni
University of Toronto alumni
20th-century Canadian biologists